Magdalena Fręch and An-Sophie Mestach were the defending champions, however Fręch chose to participate at Nottingham instead. Mestach partnered alongside Jamie Loeb, but lost in the semifinals to Naomi Broady and Asia Muhammad. 

Luksika Kumkhum and Prarthana Thombare won the title, defeating Broady and Muhammad in the final, 7–6(7–5), 6–3.

Seeds

Draw

Draw

References
Main Draw

Fuzion 100 Manchester Trophy - Doubles